Bur Dubai Derby is the Derby between Emirati football teams Al Nasr & Al Wasl, both clubs have been competitors in the UAE Pro-League and the UAE President's Cup, it is usually held twice a year but the teams face each other in other competitions from time to time, both clubs compete on who is the best club in Bur Dubai.

Statistics

Results

Pro League era

Head to head

Honours
Based on United Arab Emirates football records

References

Football rivalries in the United Arab Emirates